The Very Beast of Dio is the second greatest hits collection CD from the American heavy metal band Dio. The first to be released in the U.S., it has sold over 400,000 copies, according to SoundScan. As of 11/03/2009 it has been certified Gold by the RIAA, having sold more than 500,000 copies in the US.

A follow-up of this compilation, The Very Beast of Dio Vol. 2, was released on October 9, 2012.

Track listing

Credits
Ronnie James Dio - vocals, keyboards
Vivian Campbell - guitars
Craig Goldy - guitars on tracks 13, 14
Rowan Robertson - guitars on track 15
Tracy G – guitars on track 16
Jimmy Bain - bass
Teddy Cook - bass on track 15
Jeff Pilson – bass, keyboards on track 16
Vinny Appice - drums
Simon Wright - drums on track 15
Claude Schnell - keyboards
Jens Johansson - keyboards on track 15

Certifications

References

Dio (band) albums
2000 greatest hits albums
Rhino Records compilation albums
Warner Music Group compilation albums